Fay Abrahams Stender (March 29, 1932 – May 19, 1980) was an American lawyer from the San Francisco Bay Area, and a prisoner rights activist. Some of her better-known clients included Black Panther leader Huey Newton, and the Soledad Brothers, including Black Guerrilla Family founder George Jackson.

Soledad Brothers and George Jackson
In 1970, after Stender edited and arranged for Jackson's prison letters to be published as Soledad Brother: The Prison Letters of George Jackson, he became a celebrity. She persuaded French intellectual Jean Genet to write an introduction, propelling the book to a best seller. The substantial proceeds from the book went to a legal defense fund that she set up. Stender eventually had a falling out with Jackson over his repeated requests that she smuggle weapons and explosives into the prison. Jackson was killed in 1971 during an attempted escape from San Quentin prison.

Death and legacy
In 1979, Black Guerrilla Family member Edward Glenn Brooks, recently paroled, entered Stender's home in Berkeley, tied up her son, daughter, and her lover Joan Morris and shot Stender several times for what he said was Stender's betrayal of Jackson. Brooks forced Stender to state: "I, Fay Stender, admit I betrayed George Jackson and the prison movement when they needed me most" just before he shot her. Stender was left paralyzed below the waist; in constant pain from her injuries, she committed suicide in Hong Kong about a year later, after testifying against Brooks.

The California Women Lawyers Association has an award dedicated to her memory. Established in 1982, the annual award is given to "a feminist attorney who, like Fay Stender, is committed to the representation of women, disadvantaged groups and unpopular causes, and whose courage, zest for life and demonstrated ability to effect change as a single individual make her a role model for women attorneys."

See also
Soledad Brothers

References

1932 births
1980 suicides
American shooting survivors
American victims of crime
American women jurists
California lawyers
Crimes in the San Francisco Bay Area
Law in the San Francisco Bay Area
Lawyers from Berkeley, California
LGBT lawyers
LGBT people from the San Francisco Bay Area
People with paraplegia
Reed College alumni
Suicides in Hong Kong
University of California, Berkeley alumni
University of Chicago Law School alumni
20th-century American lawyers
20th-century American women
1980 deaths
20th-century American LGBT people